Kilnwick Percy is a hamlet in the East Riding of Yorkshire, England.

Kilnwick Percy forms part of the civil parish of Nunburnholme.

Kilnwick Percy Hall is a Grade II* listed country house built around 1845. It is now a Buddhist meditation and retreat centre.

The grounds of the hall include a lake and a small church in the Norman style dedicated to Saint Helen. The church is designated a Grade II listed building and is now recorded in the National Heritage List for England, maintained by Historic England.

In 1823 Kilnwick Percy was a civil parish in the Wapentake and Liberty of Holderness. The ecclesiastical parish was under the patronage of the Dean of York. Population at the time was 43.

References

External links

Villages in the East Riding of Yorkshire